Ahmet Rasim (1864–1932) was an Ottoman liberal politician and writer, who wrote primarily about social issues.

Biography
Ahmet Rasim was born in Istanbul in 1864. He was a graduate of the Darüşşafaka High School. After graduation he worked as a civil servant for a short time. Then he involved in journalism and published books. He also translated some literary work and produced songs. He worked for numerous publications, including Tercüman-ı Hakikat, Saadet, İkdam, Sabah, Malumat, Servet, Servet-i Fünun, Tanin, Hak, and Tasvir-i Efkar. 

He died in 1932.

References

External links

1864 births
1932 deaths
19th-century writers from the Ottoman Empire
Political people from the Ottoman Empire
20th-century writers from the Ottoman Empire
Writers from Istanbul